The Uinta Mountains are an east-west trending chain of mountains in northeastern Utah extending a short distance into northwest Colorado and slightly into southwestern Wyoming in the United States. The Mirror Lake Highway crosses the western half of the Uintas on its way to Wyoming. Utah state highway 44 crosses the east end of the Uintas between Vernal UT and Manila UT.

Etymology
The name "Uinta" derives from the Ute word Yoov-we-teuh, meaning "pine forest" or "pine tree".

Geology

The Uinta Mountains are Laramide uplifted metasedimentary rocks deposited in an intracratonic basin in southwest Laurentia during the time of the breakup of the supercontinent Rodinia. The marine and fluvial metasedimentary rocks in the core of the Uinta Mountains are of Neoproterozoic age (between about 700 million and 760 million years old) and consist primarily of quartzite, slate, and shale. Most of the high peaks are outcrops of the Uinta Mountain Group. Many of the peaks are ringed with bands of cliffs, rising to form broad or flat tops. The mountains are bounded to the north and south by reverse faults that meet below the range, on the north by the North Flank fault and on the south by the Uinta Basin boundary fault.

The Uinta Mountain Group, from oldest to youngest, includes Uinta Mountain undivided quartz arenite, overlain by the Moosehorn Lake, Mount Watson, Hades Peak, and Red Shale formations.  The flanks of the east-west trending Uinta Mountains contain a sequence of Paleozoic and Mesozoic strata ranging from the Cambrian Lodore Formation to the Cretaceous Mancos Shale, all of which have been tilted during the uplift of the mountain range.

The uplift of the range dates to the Laramide orogeny, about 70 to 50 million years ago, when compressive forces produced high-angle reverse faults on both the north and south sides of the present mountain range. The east-west orientation of the Uintas is anomalous compared to most of the ranges of the Rocky Mountains; it may relate to changing stress patterns and rotation of the Colorado Plateau. The Green River used to flow into the Mississippi River to the Gulf of Mexico, but changed to the Colorado River by going through the Uintas in ways not fully understood.

The high Uintas were extensively glaciated during the last ice age, and most of the large stream valleys on both the north and south sides of the range held long valley glaciers. The Uintas are the most poleward mountain range in the world to reach over  without modern glaciers, and are in fact the highest mountain range in the contiguous United States with no modern glaciers. Permafrost occurs at elevations above  and at times forms large rock glaciers.

Between the summits and ridgelines are wide, level basins with around 500 small lakes. One of the most popular lakes is Mirror Lake because of its good fishing, scenic views, and easy road access.

Hydrology

The south and east sides of the range are largely within the Colorado River watershed, including the Blacks Fork and the Duchesne River, which are tributaries of the Green River. The Green is the major tributary of the Colorado River and flows in a tight arc around the eastern side of the range. (Indeed, John Wesley Powell said the Green was the "master stream" where it and the Colorado River came together.)

The Bear and Weber rivers, the two largest tributaries of Great Salt Lake, are born on the west slope of the range. The Provo River, the largest tributary to Utah Lake, begins on the southern side of the range and flows west to Utah Lake, which itself drains via the Jordan River into Great Salt Lake.

The high Uintas are snowcapped most of the year except for late July through early September.

Ecology

The Uinta Mountains are part of the Wasatch and Uinta montane forests ecoregion. Nearly the entire range lies within Uinta-Wasatch-Cache National Forest (on the north and west) and Ashley National Forest (on the south and east). The range's highest peaks are protected as part of the High Uintas Wilderness. The forests contain many species of trees, including lodgepole pine, subalpine fir, Engelmann spruce, Douglas-fir, and quaking aspen.  There are also many species of grasses, shrubs, and forbs growing in the Uinta Mountains. Fauna is typical of the central Rocky Mountains. Large grazing and browsing animals include Rocky Mountain Elk, Mule Deer, Moose, Pronghorn Antelope, mountain goats, and Rocky Mountain Bighorn Sheep. Mammalian predators include Black Bear, Mountain Lion, Coyotes, Red Fox, Badger, Wolverine, Marten, and Long-tailed Weasel. A Gray Wolf pack has been observed at the eastern end of the range, in Moffat County, Colorado. Raptors include Bald And Golden Eagles, Turkey Vulture, various hawks and harriers, and owls including Great Horned, Great Grey and Barn Owls. Other notable large birds include Sage Grouse and White-tailed Ptarmigan.

Points of interest
The camp is near mile marker 33 of the Mirror Lake Highway.

The Uinta Highline Trail traverses the entire range and is a popular backpacking trail.

Dinosaur National Monument is located on the southeast flank of the Uinta Mountains on the border between Colorado and Utah.

See also

 List of mountain ranges
 Mountain ranges of Utah
 High Uintas Wilderness

References

Further reading
 Davis, Mel, and Veranth, John, High Uinta Trails, Salt Lake City: Wasatch Publishers, 1988 (3rd edition) 
 Hansen, Wallace R. The Geologic Story of the Uinta Mountains, Washington, DC: United States Government Printing Office, 1969

External links

 Uinta Mountain Lakes Map/Info - an interactive map for exploring the high Uinta lakes

 01
Ranges of the Rocky Mountains
Mountain ranges of Utah
Mountain ranges of Wyoming
Colorado Plateau
Mountain ranges of Duchesne County, Utah
Mountain ranges of Summit County, Utah
Mountain ranges of Wasatch County, Utah
Ashley National Forest
Wasatch-Cache National Forest
Mountain ranges of Daggett County, Utah